Sir Thomas Clarke,  (born 10 January 1941) is a British Labour Party politician who was a Member of Parliament (MP) from 1982 until 2015, representing Coatbridge, Chryston and Bellshill from 2005 until losing his seat to Philip Boswell of the SNP in the May 2015 general election.

Personal life
Clarke was born in Coatbridge and was educated at All Saints Primary School in Airdrie and St Columba High School in Coatbridge, followed by the Scottish College of Commerce in Glasgow. His brother, Tony, later become a councillor on North Lanarkshire Council.

Clarke has long been a strong supporter of British film making and was an Assistant Director of the Scottish Council for Education Technology and was also the President of the British Amateur Cinematographers Central Council in 1971. He then became a Deputy Director of the Scottish Film Council and was the organiser of the Scottish International Amateur Film Festival in 1971.

In 1973 Clarke submitted his short film, "Give Us a Goal" to the amateur section of the Cannes Film Festival. He is a member of the GMB and British Film Institute as well as being the chairman of The Citizens Trust.

Career in local government
Clarke's political career began at the age of 18, when he was the election agent for the Labour MP James Dempsey. Aged 22, he then served as a councillor on the Coatbridge Town Council from 1964, and he became a Justice of the Peace for the Lanark area in 1972. The Coatbridge Town Council was replaced with the Monklands District Council in 1975, where Clarke continued to serve Coatbridge. He then served as the Monklands Provost (Mayor) for three consecutive terms from 1974 until 1982. He served as the vice president of the Convention of Scottish Local Authorities from 1976 until 1978, and as president of the convention from 1978 until 1980.

Career in Parliament
Clarke was selected to contest the 1982 Coatbridge and Airdrie by-election caused by the death of the sitting Labour MP James Dempsey. He won the by-election on 24 June 1982 with a majority of 10,090. Clarke became known quite quickly in parliament for his work on issues surrounding disabled people and in 1986 he sponsored the 'Disabled Persons (Services, Representation and Consultation) Act'.

After the 1987 general election, Neil Kinnock appointed him Shadow Minister for Personal Social Services from 1987, in which role he served until 1992. Clarke then became a member of the Shadow Cabinet of John Smith as Shadow Scottish Secretary. Clarke was diagnosed with chronic fatigue syndrome in 1992 but has since recovered. He then became the Shadow Minister for Overseas Development in 1993. Clarke left the Shadow Cabinet in 1994 and returned in 1995 to serve as Shadow Minister for the Disabled until 1997 under the leadership of Tony Blair.

Following the 1997 general election he joined the Privy Council and served as a Minister of State at the Department for Culture, Media and Sport with responsibility for Film and Tourism. He was reportedly dismissed from the role in a major government reshuffle whilst visiting the film set of Notting Hill.

Clarke was the Treasurer of the All-Party Parliamentary Group on Overseas Development and authored the International Development (Reporting and Transparency) Act 2006, which ensures that the Secretary of State for International Development reports on what the Department for International Development spends in total on international aid and is categorised into what proportion is spent upon low-income countries, the effectiveness of current spending and the level of transparency of international aid. The Act is also used as a guide to establish the current progress upon United Nations Millennium Development Goals.

He served as the Treasurer of the All Party Group on Carers from 2005 until 2010 and was the Chair of the All Party Group on Learning Disabilities.

Clarke served on the Administration Committee from 2008 until 2010. In the following parliament he was a member of the Standards and Privileges Committee and the Joint Committee reviewing the draft bill on Reform of the House of Lords. In 2014 Clarke received £15,000 in damages for defamation in the Daily Mail which incorrectly claimed he was involved in the decision to reduce the amount of expenses that MP Maria Miller should repay, motivated by his own expenses claims.

Whilst Clarke voted for the Civil Partnership Act, which gave same sex couples identical civil law rights that married couples have, he voted against the Marriage (Same Sex Couples) Bill, which eventually was passed with cross-party support.

Honours

Clarke was appointed Commander of the Order of the British Empire (CBE) in 1980 for services to local government. He was sworn of the Privy Council of the United Kingdom on 20 May 1997

In 2016, Clarke was awarded a Papal Knighthood and an audience with Pope Francis for his work on International Development and Disability Rights.

He was knighted in the 2021 New Year Honours for public and political service.

Footnotes

External links
Tom Clarke MP official constituency website

Articles
 2006 International Development Bill
 Accusing utility companies of being greedy
 Compensation payments for Scottish miners
 Victims of CJD

|-

|-

|-

|-

|-

|-

|-

1941 births
Living people
Commanders of the Order of the British Empire
Knights Bachelor
Scottish Labour councillors
Members of the Privy Council of the United Kingdom
People from Coatbridge
People with chronic fatigue syndrome
Politicians awarded knighthoods
Scottish Labour MPs
UK MPs 1979–1983
UK MPs 1983–1987
UK MPs 1987–1992
UK MPs 1992–1997
UK MPs 1997–2001
UK MPs 2001–2005
UK MPs 2005–2010
UK MPs 2010–2015
Politicians from North Lanarkshire